Giorgia Benecchi (Parma, 9 July 1989) is an Italian pole vaulter.

Biography
Like many others pole vaulters Benecchi came from the artistic gymnastics, a sport in which she was very promising. She's a friend of the other Italian pole vaulter Roberta Bruni.

Personal bests
 Pole vault outdoor: 4.35 m ( Modena, 19 June 2012)
 Pole vault indoor: 4.40 m ( Ancona, 17 February 2013)

Progression
Pole vault indoor
Her personal best of 4.40 m set in 2013 was the 35th best world performance of the year.

Achievements

National titles
She has won two times the individual national championship.
1 win in the pole vault (2013)
1 win in the pole vault indoor (2014)

See also
Italian all-time lists - Pole vault

References

External links
 

1989 births
Italian female pole vaulters
Living people
Athletes (track and field) at the 2013 Mediterranean Games
Mediterranean Games competitors for Italy
Sportspeople from Parma
21st-century Italian women